Chloracris is an Asian genus of bush-crickets in the tribe Pseudophyllini and the subfamily Pseudophyllinae.

Species
The Orthoptera Species File lists:
Chloracris borneensis de Jong, 1939 - Borneo
Chloracris brullei Pictet & Saussure, 1892 - Sumatra, Java
Chloracris brunneri Beier, 1954 - China, Vietnam, Borneo
Chloracris pantherina de Jong, 1939 - Sumatra
Chloracris prasina (Pictet & Saussure, 1892) - Indian subcontinent, Sumatra, Java

Note: A binomial authority in parentheses indicates that the species was originally described in a genus other than Chloracris.

References

External links
 saltatoria.info: photo of Chloracris cf. prasina
 

Pseudophyllinae
Tettigoniidae genera
Orthoptera of Indo-China
Orthoptera of Asia